Kapiolani may refer to:
Chiefess Kapiolani (c. 1781–1841)
Queen Kapiolani (1834–1899)
Royal Order of Kapiolani

Hospitals
Kapiolani Medical Center for Women and Children

People with the given name
Abigail Kapiolani Kawānanakoa (1903–1961), daughter of Prince David Kawānanakoa and Princess Abigail Campbell Kawānanakoa in Honolulu

See also